The Sudan women's national football team is the official women's national football team of the country of Sudan. The team was established in 2021, and is controlled by the Sudan Football Association (SFA), the governing body for football in Sudan.

Women were not allowed to officially participate in sports such as football, until the Sudanese revolution of 2018–19 abolished the former restrictive public order laws. In September 2019, a women's league with 21 teams from different cities in Sudan was established. The national team first qualified for the 2021 Arab Women's Cup, organized by the Union of Arab Football Associations (UAFA) in Cairo, Egypt.

History

Background
The Sudan Football Association, which was founded in 1946, and became FIFA affiliated in 1948, was one of the founding members of the Confederation of African Football (CAF), and continues to be a member of the Confederation.

According to a 2011 study of the relationship between religious fundamentalism and globalized societies, the fact that some Sudanese women already had started playing football since the early 2000s despite social and legal restrictions was considered a critical step for the development of an unofficial women's league. As part of this informal league, a first national women's team called The Challenge was created in 2006 in Khartoum. In 2006, The Challenge played its first competitive match. It was captained by Sara Edward and played against a team from Sudan University that wore clothes corresponding to Islamic norms. As reported, the quality of play was not high and the game ended in a 2–0 win for The Challenge team.

In response to a question from FIFA regarding the feasibility of creating a women's national team in 2012, the Islamic Fiqh Council issued another fatwa against the creation of a women's soccer team, deeming it an immoral act. The fatwa claimed that football was a men's sport and women should not participate in it, because it challenges the differences between men and women.

Recognition 
Following the establishment of a women's league in 2019 with 21 teams from different cities under the new transitional government, the Sudan Football Association recognized and started to support women's local and national teams. At the start of 2021, Sudan's women's national team continued to lack FIFA recognition. By August of that year, however, it had been recognized by the Confederation of African Football (CAF) and was invited to participate in the 2021 Arab Women's Cup.

Since its official recognition in 2019, Sudan joined other countries in the Arab and African regions to have a women's league. Due to its membership in the Union of Arab Football Associations (UAFA), the national team's first international competition was in 2021, when they played in the Arab Women's Cup.

In popular media 
The 2019 award-winning documentary Khartoum Offside by Sudanese filmmaker Marwa Zein tells the story of the women who made up The Challenge team under the Islamist government of the time.

Results and fixtures 

The following is a list of match results in the last 12 months, as well as any future matches that have been scheduled.

Source: Goalzz.com

Legend

2023

Coaching staff

Current coaching staff

Manager history

 Faroug Jabra (2021–2022)
 Imed Houjly (2022–present)

Players

Current squad
The following players were called up for the friendly match against South Sudan in February 2022.

Recent call-ups
The following players have been called up to the squad in the past 12 months.

 

INJ Player withdrew from the squad due to an injury.
PRE Preliminary squad.
SUS Player is serving a suspension.
WD Player withdrew for personal reasons.

Records
*Active players in bold, statistics correct as of 26 August 2021.

Most capped players

Top goalscorers

Competitive record

FIFA Women's World Cup

*Draws include knockout matches decided on penalty kicks.

Olympic Games

*Draws include knockout matches decided on penalty kicks.

Africa Women Cup of Nations

*Draws include knockout matches decided on penalty kicks.

African Games

CECAFA Women's Championship

Arab Women's Cup

All−time record against FIFA recognized nations
The list shown below shows the Sudan national football team all−time international record against opposing nations.
*As of 22 February 2022 after match against South Sudan.
Key

See also

Sport in Sudan
Football in Sudan
Women's football in Sudan
Sudan  women's national under-20 football team
Sudan women's national under-17 football team
Sudan men's national football team
Women's association football

Notes

References

External links

 Sudan's fearless female footballers – short video by Deutsche Welle

َArabic women's national association football teams
Sudan women's national football team
African women's national association football teams
Sport in Sudan by sport
Women's football in Sudan